Tish is a 1942 comedy-drama film directed by S. Sylvan Simon and starring Marjorie Main and ZaSu Pitts.

Cast
 Marjorie Main as Miss Letitia "Tish" Carberry
 ZaSu Pitts as Aggie Pilkington
 Aline MacMahon as Lizzie Wilkins
 Lee Bowman as Charles "Charlie" Sands, Tish's nephew
 Guy Kibbee as Judge Horace Bowser
 Susan Peters as Cora Edwards Bowzer
 Virginia Grey as Katherine "Kit" Bowser Sands
 Richard Quine as Theodore "Ted" Bowser

Reception
The film made $576,000 in the U.S. and Canada and $112,000 foreign markets, earning the studio a profit of $160,000.

References

External links
 
 Tish at TCMDB
 
 

1942 films
1942 comedy-drama films
Metro-Goldwyn-Mayer films
1940s English-language films
American black-and-white films
Films based on short fiction
American comedy-drama films
Films based on works by Mary Roberts Rinehart
1940s American films